Oliver Holmes may refer to:

 Oliver Holmes (rugby league)
 Oliver Wendell Holmes (disambiguation)